The Last Text EP is the debut EP by the American singer Jacob Sartorius, released on January 20, 2017. In 2017, Sartorius embarked on his first tour to promote the EP. "Hit or Miss" was released as the first single on July 25, 2016. A music video for "Bingo" was released on March 31, 2017.

The EP debuted at number 32 on the Billboard 200, number one on the Independent Albums and number five on the Digital Albums chart with 12,000 album equivalent units.

Track listing

Charts

References

2017 debut EPs
Jacob Sartorius albums